BDF-3299 is a remote galaxy with a redshift of z = 7.109 corresponds to a distance traveled by light to come down to Earth of 12.9 billion light-years.

See also
List of most distant galaxies
List of the most distant astronomical objects

Sources
 

Galaxies
Piscis Austrinus